Like an Arrow is the fifth studio album by American rock band Blackberry Smoke. The album was self-produced by the band and it was released on October 14, 2016.

Background
According to Charlie Starr, they had not intended to make an album when the band began practicing a few new songs he had written when they had a month off in January 2016. As the songs came together quickly, they decided to go the Quarry Recording Studio outside their hometown of Atlanta to record their fifth album. However, they were not sure who they wanted as producer for the album, but had a clear idea what they wanted to do with the songs, so they chose to produce the album themselves. The drummer Brit Turner also designed the album artwork. The last song on the album, "Free on the Wing", features a duet with Gregg Allman, whom they regarded as an inspiration for the band.

The first track of the album, "Waiting for the Thunder", was released as the lead single from the album.

Reception
The album received a Metacritic rating of 76 based on 6 reviews, indicating generally favorable reviews.

The album debuted at No. 12 on Billboard 200, No. 3 on Top Rock Albums, as well as No. 1 on both the Top Country Albums and Americana/Folk Albums chart, selling 18,000 copies in its first sales week.  It sold a further 4,200 copies in its second week. The album has sold 48,000 copies as of August 2017.

The album also debuted at No. 8 on the UK Albums chart, as well as No. 1 on UK Independent Albums, Americana Albums, and Rock & Metal Albums charts.

Track listing

Personnel

Musicians 
Charlie Starr - lead vocals, guitar, pedal steel, banjo. 
Richard Turner - bass guitar, vocals.
Paul Jackson - guitar, vocals. 
Brandon Still - piano, organ.
Brit Turner - drums, percussion.

Charts

Weekly charts

Year-end charts

References

2016 albums
Blackberry Smoke albums